The Gulf of Anadyr, or Anadyr Bay, is a large bay on the Bering Sea in far northeast Siberia. It has a total surface area of

Location
The bay is roughly rectangular and opens to the southeast. The corners are (clockwise from the south) Cape Navarin (another source says the adjacent Cape Thaddeus), Anadyr Estuary, Kresta Bay and Cape Chukotsky on the Chukchi Peninsula. The Gulf of Anadyr is covered with ice normally 10 months a year. Whales such as bowhead and gray may appear close to shore.

Civilization
The town of Anadyr, the administrative centre of Chukotka Autonomous Okrug, is located on the Anadyr Estuary.  Provideniya, on Komsomolskaya Bay (formerly Emma Harbor; a branch of Provideniya Bay), and Egvekinot, on Kresta Bay, are the next largest coastal settlements.

See also
Vtoraya River

Notes

References
 
 United States Hydrographic Office (1909). Asiatic pilot, Volume 1. Issues 122-126; Issue 162 of H.O. pub. Gov. Printing Off., Washington. pp 50–51.

Further reading

Bays of the Bering Sea
Bays of Chukotka Autonomous Okrug
Anadyr
Anadyr
Pacific Coast of Russia
Bodies of water of Chukotka Autonomous Okrug